Ignace Van Der Brempt (born 1 April 2002) is a Belgian professional footballer  who plays as a defender for Austrian Bundesliga club Red Bull Salzburg.

Club career
He made his Belgian First Division A debut for Club Brugge on 14 September 2019 in a game against Cercle Brugge. 

In February 2022 he moved to FC Red Bull Salzburg in the Austrian Bundesliga. He signed a contract until June 2026.

Honours
Club Brugge
 Belgian Pro League: 2019–20, 2020–21
 Belgian Super Cup: 2021

Red Bull Salzburg
 Austrian Bundesliga: 2021–22
 Austrian Cup: 2021–22

References

External links
 
 

2002 births
Living people
Belgian footballers
Belgium youth international footballers
Belgium under-21 international footballers
Association football defenders
Club Brugge KV players
Club NXT players
FC Red Bull Salzburg players
Belgian Pro League players
Belgian expatriate footballers
Expatriate footballers in Austria
Belgian expatriate sportspeople in Austria